Grosvenor Light Opera Company (GLOC) is a nonprofit community theatre organization in London, established in 1949 to study and perform the works of Gilbert and Sullivan.  The company is the only (non-student) amateur Gilbert and Sullivan group both to rehearse and perform in central London and has been described by Ian Bradley as the "leading amateur G & S performing group in London".

Stage productions 

As well as performing the Savoy operas in central London, the group has produced a number of touring pieces including the London premier of the revived version of Gilbert's Engaged in 1964, work taken to the International Gilbert and Sullivan Festival and has toured with Cox and Box.

Recorded productions 

A series of 78 RPM recordings are available from the 1930s by 'The Grosvenor Light Opera Company'; it is not clear how the company that recorded these works are related to the modern group.

In 1998 members of the group appeared as the Gilbert and Sullivan Choir in an episode of Kavanagh QC

Notable alumni

Notable alumni include Sarah Olney former MP for Richmond Park.

References

External links 
 Grosvenor Light Opera Company

Community theatre
Musical groups established in 1949
Theatre companies in London
1949 establishments in England